Legion of Super-Heroes is a 2023 American animated superhero film based on the DC Comics superhero team of the same name, produced by Warner Bros. Animation and distributed by Warner Bros. Home Entertainment. It is the sixth feature length installment of the "Tomorrowverse" sharing continuity with the films of that franchise and the overall 51st installment in the DC Universe Animated Original Movies line. The film is directed by Jeff Wamester from a script by Josie Campbell while Jim Krieg, Kimberly S. Moreau serve as producers, Butch Lukic serve as supervising pruducer and Sam Register serve as executive producer. The film was released on digital and to home video formats on February 7, 2023.

Plot
In Argo City on Krypton, Alura Zor-El has been preparing for a catastrophe her brother-in-law Jor-El has predicted which will destroy the planet. However, the disaster strikes too early, and most of the rescue pods she has readied are disabled. Alura has just enough time to send her daughter Kara to Earth, where she is supposed to reunite with her younger cousin Kal-El, who is to arrive there in his own escape ship. But just after take-off, a fragment of the exploding planet damages Kara's escape pod, putting her into suspended animation and sending the vessel into a trajectory which lets her arrive on Earth much later than intended.

After her arrival, Kara - now named Supergirl - has trouble adjusting to life on Earth with its more primitive culture, and to the superpowers bestowed on her by her new environment. During a fight with Solomon Grundy, she spots a group of masked individuals lurking nearby before she has to be rescued by Kal-El (now called Superman) and Batman. Noting her depression, Kal-El suggests that Kara should travel to the 31st century and join the Legion Academy, a training school for prospective candidates for the Legion of Super-Heroes, who have established sporadic contact with him. In the 21st century, Batman intercepts the masked individuals raiding S.T.A.R. Labs, but the intruders commit suicide before he can question them.

Travelling to the future, Kara is introduced to the Academy by one of its trainees, Mon-El, but starts a spontaneous fight with Brainiac 5, another Academy member, whom she mistakes for her cousin's mortal enemy Brainiac. While the misunderstanding is swiftly cleared, Brainiac 5 is distrusted by the other students and the remaining Legionnaires Timber Wolf, Chemical King and Shadow Lass (the rest being away on an extended mission in deep space) because of his ancestry and the fact that his four predecessors have inevitably become notorious criminals. Kara's own relationship with Brainiac 5 is initially antagonistic as well, but as time passes, they develop a mutual understanding for each other which eventually turns romantic.

One night, while looking for the school's pet Proty, Triplicate Girl spots Mon-El lurking near a forbidden high-security vault on the Academy's grounds, before she is attacked by two masked individuals. Shortly after, Kara catches Brainiac 5 near the vault before they discover Triplicate Girl's mutilated body. Brainiac 5 is arrested by the Legionnaires, who have discovered that he enrolled in the Academy to penetrate the vault, which contains some of the most dangerous weapons in the universe. Brainiac 5 tries to explain that he did so to counter a mysterious organization called the Dark Circle, but only Kara believes him. After recognizing the masked figures she saw in the past from the Academy computer's files on the Dark Circle, she breaks Brainiac 5 out of his confinement and learns from him that the Dark Circle is trying to get their hands on the Miracle Machine, a device capable of bending reality at its user's whim which is kept inside the vault, and that his family wants to steal it for the Circle's leader.

Joined by Mon-El, Kara and Brainiac 5 enter the vault and overcome its security system. But when they find the machine, Mon-El reveals himself as an agent of the Dark Circle, stabs Kara with a kryptonite blade and summons the rest of the Circle, who overpower the Legionnaires and Academy students. Then the Circle's leader appears and is revealed as Brainiac, who has founded the Dark Circle in the 21st century to faciliate his resurrection and has plotted for Brainiac 5 to grant him access to the Miracle Machine. Brainiac 5's predecessors, originally created for that purpose, were all not intelligent enough to break the vault's security code, and their bodies were used to reconstruct Brainiac, with their minds remaining fully intact. He claims that he has foreseen a great danger approaching, and plans to bend reality to eliminate it and make himself the savior of the universe.

Escaping Brainiac's presence, Kara and Brainiac 5 are joined by their fellow students Triplicate Girl (who had lost merely one of her other selves to Mon-El and the Circle), Invisible Kid and Phantom Girl, who have eluded capture, and together they rescue Dawnstar, Bouncing Boy and Arm-Fall-Off-Boy. After sending an SOS to the Legionnaires in space, the other students distract Mon-El and the Circle while Kara and Brainiac 5 move to stop Brainiac. Whereas they cannot prevent the Miracle Machine's activation, Brainiac 5 turns his predecessors against their creator, causing Brainiac's body to literally tear itself apart. The machine goes out of control, and in her attempt to stop it, Kara summons Alura's soul. Though briefly tempted to reverse Krypton's destruction, she comes to terms with her loss, and with her mother's blessing stops the cataclysm by displacing the machine into another reality. Afterwards, the students defeat Mon-El and the Circle, whereupon the returning Legionnaires grant them all full membership in the Legion.

In a post-credits scene, Kara contacts Superman to tell him about her decision to stay in the 31st century and her new relationship with Brainiac 5. After the call is ended, Superman and Batman inspect a freshly melted crater in the midst of Metropolis when they are both suddenly hit and apparently annihilated by an energy blast from space.

Voice cast

Production

Development 
The idea of a Legion of Superheroes film was conceived by Butch Lukic and Jim Krieg, who wanted to incorporate both Supergirl and the team into the Tomorrowverse. Lukic hired Jeff Wamester as director due to their previous collaboration in Justice Society: World War II (2021).

Speculation of a Legion Of Super-Heroes film began in June 2022 when the Motion Picture Association gave a PG-13 rating to an unannounced film. The film was confirmed by Warner Bros. Home Entertainment the next month at the San Diego Comic-Con after the premier of Green Lantern: Beware My Power. The film is the first DC animated film to be released by DC Studios, which took over development on all DC projects in November 2022.

Casting 
In October 2022, the voice cast of the film was revealed, featuring Meg Donnelly as Supergirl, Harry Shum Jr. as Brainiac 5, Cynthia Hamidi as Dawnstar, Gideon Adlon as Phantom Girl, Ely Henry as Bouncing Boy, Robbie Daymond as Timber Wolf and Brainiac 4, Yuri Lowenthal as Mon-El, Eric Lopez as Cosmic Boy and Chemical King, Darin De Paul as Brainiac and Solomon Grundy, Benjamin Diskin as Arm-Fall-Off-Boy and Brainiac 2, Victoria Grace as Shadow Lass, Jennifer Hale as Alura, Daisy Lightfoot as Triplicate Girl, and Zeno Robinson as Invisible Kid and Brainiac 3. Darren Criss, Matt Bomer, and Jensen Ackles were also announced to be reprising their roles from previous DC films as Superman, Flash, and Batman, respectively.

Donelly was cast as Supergirl after voice director Wes Gleason showed Lukic footage of her previous work. Robinson was allowed to improvise many of his lines during recording. He also wanted to develop his own take on Invisible Boy, as the film marked his first appearance in media outside of comics.

Release 
A trailer for the film was released on November 16, 2022, and on the following day its release date was announced for February 7, 2023. Legion of Super-Heroes was released on home media on DVD, Blu-ray, 4K, and video on demand on February 7, 2023.

Reception

Sam Stone of Comic Book Resources wrote: "Though the movie could up the ante on some of its major set pieces, it does get to the heart of what makes the Legion tick". Brian Costello of Common Sense Media described the film as "a pretty standard but enjoyable superhero animated action movie".

References

External links 
 
 

2023 animated films
2020s American animated films
2020s direct-to-video animated superhero films
2020s English-language films
2020s superhero films
2023 direct-to-video films
2023 films
American animated films
Animated action films
DC Universe Animated Original Movies
Films set in the 31st century
Tomorrowverse